Emmy Lou Packard also known as Betty Lou Packard (1914–1998) was a Californian post-war artist known for painting, printmaking and murals.

Early life 
Emmy Lou Packard was born on April 15, 1914, near El Centro, California, to parents Emma and Walter Packard. Her father founded an agricultural cooperative community in the Imperial Valley and was an internationally known agronomist. In 1927, the Packard family traveled to Mexico for Walter's consulting job with the Mexican government working on agrarian and land settlement reform issues. Emmy then 13 years, was already painting and drawing. Her mother introduced her to artists Diego Rivera and Frida Kahlo, marking the beginning of a long friendship and mentorship.

In 1934, she eloped to Nevada with the architect Burton Cairns, a recent graduate of the University of California, Berkeley. They had a baby together, Donald Cairns.

In 1936 Packard graduated from the University of California, Berkeley with her bachelor's degree and later studied sculpture, mural and fresco painting at the San Francisco Art Institute.

Career 
In 1939, her husband, Burton Cairns, died in a car accident. After his death, she traveled to Mexico to live with Rivera and Kahlo, working as their studio assistant. During the time she stayed with Rivera and Kahlo, she took a number of photographs of the couple.

When Diego Rivera came to San Francisco in 1940 for the Golden Gate International Exposition (GGIE), he asked Emmy to be the chief assistant for painting the Pan American Unity mural.

Between 1944 and 1945, she briefly worked as an illustrator of a labor newspaper for the San Francisco Bay Area shipyards.

Packard designed and executed the mural on the exterior of the dining commons at the University of California, Berkeley in the Lower Sproul student union center. She also designed the terrace parapet which is embellished with an 85-foot long, 5-foot high, bas-relief, Modernist mural depicting California landscape features, including coastal bluffs, cultivated fields, mountains, and rivers located in the central façade of Chávez Student Center at the University of California, Berkeley in the Lower Sproul.

On May 29, 1959, she married artist Byron T. Randall; they divorced in 1972.

Packard was an active community member in the Mission District of San Francisco and San Francisco's community mural movement. In 1974 she served as a mural technical adviser for the Bank of America building mural located at Mission Street and 23rd Street; the local artists that painted this mural are Jesús “Chuy” Campusano, Luis Cortázar and Michael Rios. In 1960 and 1975, Packard and Dorothy Wagner Puccinelli restored murals, including Coit Tower.

Packard died February 22, 1998, in San Francisco, California of diabetes and related illnesses.

In 2022, the Richmond Art Center held an exhibition of Packard's linocuts: "Emmy Lou Packard: Artist of Conscience."

References

External links 
 Emmy Lou Packard papers, from the Archives of American Art (Smithsonian Institution)
 Emmy Lou Packard obituary from SFGate Newspaper
 Frida Kahlo, in New York, N.Y. letter to Emmy Lou Packard, in San Francisco, Calif., from October 24, 1940  
 Emmy Lou Packard collection at the Oakland Museum of Art 
 Smithsonian Institution, collection search featuring Emmy Lou Packard

Artists from California
1914 births
1998 deaths
Social realist artists
People from El Centro, California
San Francisco Art Institute alumni
University of California, Berkeley alumni
People of the New Deal arts projects
20th-century American women artists
20th-century American people